Dotswood is a rural locality in the Charters Towers Region, Queensland, Australia. In the  Dotswood had a population of 101 people.

Geography
The neighbourhood of Macrossan is located in the west of the locality beside the bridge over the Burdekin River.

The Great Northern Railway passes through the locality. There are a number of abandoned railway stations on that line within the locality:
 Macrossan railway station
Exley railway station
 Eneby railway station
Another abandoned station is Keelbottom railway station on the now-closed Greenvale railway line.

The Hervey Range Developmental Road runs through from east to west.

History 
By late 1865 these men had transferred their holdings of the Emysland, Dotswood, Nursiedob, Keelbottom, Watershed, and Tala (or Tula).runs to the Bank of New South Wales. These properties lay on one or both sides of Keelbottom Creek. Eventually Dotswood Station comprised the runs of Arthurs Peak, Back Plains, Hardwick, Pall Mall, Poon Boon, Redyke (or Red Dyke), Smiths Brook and Yallock Vale, as well as those already mentioned.

The neighbourhood of Macrossan takes its name from the Macrossan railway station, which in turn is named after the politician John Murtagh Macrossan.

This locality was within the Star River Mineral Field, which was discovered in 1865. The following year John Macrossan passed through the area. The Ravenswood Gold Field, discovered in 1868, eventually extended north into the Star River Mineral Field.  From 1881 silver-lead deposits in the Ravenswood mining district, the most promising at Argentine, were being mined in what was called a silver mania.  However this ended suddenly in 1883, after the failure of a locally capitalized smelting works and low returns.

In late 1872  on Keelbottom Creek, Kennedy district were reserved for the town reserve of Boolangalla.

In the town of Argentine, 67 town lots, at £16 per acre, and 3 mineral selections, were offered for sale by the Crown Lands Office in October 1882.  By the next year the town consisted of several public houses, one butcher's shop, a baker's shop, three stores and two gardens. In December 1888 the name of the Star River Post Office was changed to Argentine Post Office.

In the  Dotswood had a population of 101 people.

Heritage listings 
Dotswood has a number of heritage-listed sites, including:
 Flinders Highway, Macrossan: Macrossan Stores Depot Group
Great Northern railway: Burdekin River Rail Bridge

Attractions 
Surgeons Lookout is a tourist attraction.

Amenities 
Macrossan Park is a free campground overlooking the Burdekin River, situated between the rail and road bridges .

Industry 
Most of this location is part of the Department of Defence's Townsville Field Training Area.

References

Charters Towers Region
Localities in Queensland